Jackal, in comics, may refer to:

Jackal (Marvel Comics), a mad scientist and the enemy of Spider-Man in the Marvel Comics universe
Jackal, a terrorist and enemy of Superman in the DC Comics universe

It may also refer to:

Dr. Jackal, a character from the manga/anime GetBackers
Jackalman, a character from the ThunderCats comics
Red Jackal, a character from the G.I. Joe comics

See also
Jackal (disambiguation)

References